Catalonia is part of the Iberian Peninsula in the Mediterranean Sea.

Catalonia also may refer to:

Places
Principality of Catalonia, former political unit of southwestern Europe formed by the grouping of the Catalan counties in 1162 and divided between Spain and France in 1659:
Catalonia, a political unit inside Spain, today constituted as the Spanish Autonomous Community of Catalonia.
Northern Catalonia, a political unit inside France, today constituted as the French département of the Pyrénées-Orientales.
Catalan Republic, a list of states proclaimed in the region of Catalonia
Catalan Countries, territories where the Catalan language is spoken
Old Catalonia

People
Dorothy Catalonia, a character in Mobile Suit Gundam Wing

Transportation
 (1998) or Catalonia, a ferry ship
 (1881), a passenger cargo ship

Other uses
 Operation Catalonia, Spanish 2010s police action against Catalan independence
 Catalonia Offensive, Nationalist operation against Republicans in the Spanish Civil War
 Catalonia International Trophy, international soccer friendly tournament
 Catalonia (publisher), a Chilean publishing company
Catalonia Government, autonomous government of Catalonia within Spain

See also

Wikipedia:WikiProject Catalan-speaking countries
Catalunya (disambiguation)
Catalan (disambiguation)
History of Catalonia
Northern Catalonia, linguistic region in France
Hotel Catalonia (disambiguation)